The Tajikistan Futsal League, is the top league for Futsal in Tajikistan. The winning team obtains the participation right to the AFC Futsal Club Championship.

Teams 
Teams playing the Tajikistan futsal league 2019–20 season.

Soro company
Sipar Khujand
Istaravsan
Ravsan
Karon
Samandar
Artis
Pamir

Champions 

 2015: DISI Invest
 2016: DISI Invest
 2017: DISI Invest
 2018: DISI Invest
 2019: Soro Company

See also 

 AFC Futsal club championship
 Tajikistan Football Federation
 Tajikistan national futsal team

References

Futsal in Tajikistan